= Chengalam East =

Chengalam East Paduva of Kerala
- Village
- Country: India
- State: Kerala
- District: Kottayam

Population (2011)
  - Total: 5,226

Languages
  - Official: Malayalam, English
- Time zone: UTC+5:30 (IST)
- PIN: 686585
- Telephone code: 0481
- Vehicle registration: KL-5
- Nearest city: Ponkunnam
- Lok Sabha constituency: Kottayam
- Vidhan Sabha constituency: Puthuppally
- Climate: warm (Köppen)

Chengalam East is a village in Kottayam district in the state of Kerala, India.

== Demographics ==
As of 2011 Indian census, Chengalam East had a population of 5226 with 2519 males and 2707 females.
